Botsa Jhansi Lakshmi (also spelled as Botcha Jhansi Lakshmi) is an Indian politician and past member of the Lok Sabha from Vizianagaram, Andhra Pradesh.

Personal life
Jhansi Lakshmi born on 11 April 1964 in Rajahmundry to Majji Rama Rao and Kalavathi.She studied	M.A. (Philosophy), Ph.D., B.L.(C.L). She	married Botsa Satyanarayana, Minister and former PCC of Andhra Pradesh. She has 1 Son and 1 daughter.

Career
Jhansi represented Vizianagaram Zilla Parishad Chairperson from 2001-2006.  During 2007–09, she represented the Bobbili constituency in the Lok Sabha. She   won second time Member of Loksabha from Vizianagaram Loksabha Constituency in 2009. She belongs to the Indian National Congress.

Positions Held
 2005 Member (Nominated), All India Congress Committee
 2010 Executive Member, Indian Parliamentary Group
 2010 Chairman, MGNREGA Sub-Committee, Working Group on Specific Needs of Specific Category
 2010	Chairman, India-Azerbaijan Parliamentary Friendship Group
 2010 Executive Committee Member, Congress Parliamentary Party

Awards
Awarded, Won Uttam Mahila Award, 2002-2003 (Visakha Samacharam, a Journal)

References

Living people
India MPs 2004–2009
India MPs 2009–2014
Politicians from Rajahmundry
People from Vizianagaram
Lok Sabha members from Andhra Pradesh
United Progressive Alliance candidates in the 2014 Indian general election
Indian National Congress politicians from Andhra Pradesh
Year of birth missing (living people)